Two U.S. Navy submarines have borne the name "Parche" , for a butterfly fish, Chaetodon capistratus.

 , a  diesel electric submarine which served during World War II (1943–1946).
 , a  nuclear powered attack submarine, modified for espionage duty (1973–2004).

United States Navy ship names